Roachmill is an American comic book created by Rich Hedden and Tom McWeeney, published first by Blackthorne Publishing and then Dark Horse Comics.

Publication history
Blackthorne Publishing put out the first six issues of Roachmill before creators Hedden and McWeeney were lured away by Dark Horse Comics. Dark Horse published an additional ten issues before the series was canceled. Dark Horse also published a special introductory Roachmill story in Dark Horse Presents No. 17 (April 1988), to announce the acquisition of the character.

Two trade paperback collections were issued. The first, Roachmill Book 1: Framed (1988), collects the first five issues. The second, Roachmill Book 2: The Greatest Roachmill Stories Ever Told (1989), features the final two Blackthorne stories, and the first Dark Horse story. Both books were published by Dark Horse.

Series overview
The comic is set in 30th-century New York where an influx of aliens to Earth has caused social problems. In response, the Extermination Act is enacted, a law that allows anyone who carries a gun to use lethal force in "alien-related" situation. Eventually, the law is extended to allow the killings of humans as well, allowing for the creation of licensed Exterminators. Roachmill – a tall Dirty Harry-era Clint Eastwood lookalike with two extra cockroach arms extending from his abdomen – is one such Exterminator, willing – for a price – to kill anyone or anything. The stories veered wildly between comedy, satire and serious sci-fi and the art between cartoony and realistic, sometimes in the same issue.

External links
 Roachmill at International Heroes
 Roachmill publication history with Blackthorne at Atomic Avenue
 Roachmill publication history with Dark Horse at Atomic Avenue

Blackthorne Publishing titles
Comics characters introduced in 1986
Dark Horse Comics titles